The European Graduate School (EGS) is a private graduate school that operates in two locations: Saas-Fee, Switzerland, and Valletta, Malta.

History

It was founded in 1994 in Saas-Fee, Switzerland by the Swiss scientist, artist, and therapist, Paolo Knill.  It was co-founded by the Swiss Canton of Valais, which is represented in its board.

The school initially offered programs in Expressive Arts Therapy, as part of a broader initiative to develop a network of training institutes in Expressive Arts Therapy. A division of Media and Communication (later renamed Philosophy, Art and Critical Thought) was established in 1998 by Wolfgang Schirmacher.

EGS is licensed as a university in Malta and is recognized in the Swiss canton where it operates, but is not recognized by the Swiss University Conference, the main regulatory body for universities in Switzerland.

Teaching is mostly remote, with required attendance for short periods at the school; ad hoc meetings in various cities also take place.

Notable faculty members have included Giorgio Agamben, Chantal Akerman, Pierre Alféri Judith Butler, Achille Mbembe, Avital Ronell, and Sandy Stone.

Notable alumni and attendees have included John Maus, Gael García Bernal, Ariana Reines, Micah White, Pablo Iglesias Turrión, and Bruce Barber.

Notes and references

Further reading
 MacLaughlin, Nina (10 April 2003) "Going the distance". The Phoenix.

External links
 European Graduate School

 
Educational institutions established in 1994
Universities and colleges in Switzerland
1994 establishments in Switzerland